The damsel in distress is a theme in world art, entertainment, and media, in which a beautiful woman must be rescued by a hero.

Damsel(s) in Distress may also refer to:

Damsel in Distress (song), a 2020 song by Rufus Wainwright
 "Damsel in Distress", a 2014 song by Neck Deep from Wishful Thinking
 A Damsel in Distress (novel), a 1919 novel by P. G. Wodehouse
 A Damsel in Distress (1919 film), a silent romantic comedy film based on the novel
 A Damsel in Distress (1937 film), a Hollywood musical film based on the novel
 A Damsel in Distress (musical), a 2015 musical based on the novel
 Damsels in Distress (film), a 2011 film by Whit Stillman
 Damsels in Distress (plays), a 2001 trilogy of plays by Alan Ayckbourn

See also

 or 
 or 
 or